Dorithia is a genus of moths belonging to the subfamily Tortricinae of the family Tortricidae.

Species
Dorithia consacculana Brown, in Brown & Powell, 1991
Dorithia crucifer (Walsingham, 1914)
Dorithia equadentana Brown, in Brown & Powell, 1991
Dorithia imitatrix Brown & Obraztsov in Brown & Powell, 1991
Dorithia meridionalis Brown, in Brown & Powell, 1991
Dorithia occidentana Brown, in Brown & Powell, 1991
Dorithia paraviridana Brown, in Brown & Powell, 1991
Dorithia peroneana Barnes & Busck, 1920
Dorithia powellana Brown, in Brown & Powell, 1991
Dorithia pseudocrucifer Brown, in Brown & Powell, 1991
Dorithia robustana Brown, in Brown & Powell, 1991
Dorithia semicirculana (Fernald, 1882)
Dorithia spinosana Brown, in Brown & Powell, 1991
Dorithia strigulana Brown & Obraztsov in Brown & Powell, 1991
Dorithia tototuana Brown, in Brown & Powell, 1991
Dorithia trigonana Brown & Obraztsov in Brown & Powell, 1991
Dorithia wellingana Brown, in Brown & Powell, 1991

See also
List of Tortricidae genera

References

 , 1964, Univ. Calif. Pub. Ent. 32: 116.
 , 2005, World Catalogue of Insects 5

External links
tortricidae.com

Euliini
Tortricidae genera